Bugrovsky is a rural locality (a khutor) in Saltynskoye Rural Settlement, Uryupinsky District, Volgograd Oblast, Russia. The population was 278 as of 2010. There are 9 streets.

Geography 
Bugrovsky is located in steppe, 36 km northwest of Uryupinsk (the district's administrative centre) by road. Saltynsky is the nearest rural locality.

References 

Rural localities in Uryupinsky District